The 1958 Alabama Crimson Tide football team (variously "Alabama", "UA" or "Bama") represented the University of Alabama in the 1958 NCAA University Division football season. It was the Crimson Tide's 64th overall and 25th season as a member of the Southeastern Conference (SEC). The team was led by head coach Bear Bryant, in his first year, and played their home games at Denny Stadium in Tuscaloosa, Legion Field in Birmingham and at Ladd Stadium in Mobile, Alabama. They finished with a record of five wins, four losses and one tie (5–4–1 overall, 3–4–1 in the SEC). As they finished the season above .500, Alabama secured its first winning season since 1953, and their five victories gave Bryant more wins games in one season than former head coach Jennings B. Whitworth did in previous three.

On December 3, 1957, the University formally introduced then Texas A&M head coach and former Crimson Tide player Bear Bryant as the new head coach of the Crimson Tide. In the season opener, Bama led eventual national champion LSU 3–0 at the half before they lost 13–3, and the next week played a ranked Vanderbilt team to a scoreless tie. In their third game, the Crimson Tide defeated Furman for the first victory of the Bryant era. After a loss at Tennessee, Alabama then defeated then No. 19 Mississippi State for their first victory over a ranked team since 1953 and followed that with a win over Georgia on homecoming.

The Crimson Tide were then upset at Tulane on a Friday evening, but bounced back with wins over Georgia Tech and Memphis State that secured Alabama's first winning season since 1953. After they closed the season with a loss against Auburn, Alabama declined an invitation to compete in the Bluegrass Bowl to end Bryant's first season and became the only Bryant coached team at Alabama to not have participated in a bowl game.

Schedule

Game summaries

LSU

Source:

To open the Bear Bryant era, Alabama led 3–0 at halftime but lost 13–3 to the eventual national champion LSU Tigers in Ladd Stadium in Mobile. After a scoreless first quarter, the Crimson Tide took a 3–0 halftime lead after Fred Sington, Jr. connected on an eight-yard field goal. Midway through the half, a section of bleachers in the north end zone collapsed and resulted in 60 spectators being injured. The collapse resulted in a stoppage of play while emergency responders worked to assist those injured by the collapse.

LSU took a 7–3 lead in the third quarter when Warren Rabb threw a nine-yard touchdown pass to Johnny Robinson that capped a 67-yard drive. Billy Cannon then scored on a 12-yard touchdown run in the fourth quarter that made the final score 13–3. For the game, the Tigers were led by head coach Paul Dietzel who previously served as an assistant coach for Bryant during his tenure at Kentucky. The loss brought Alabama's all-time record against LSU to 15–8–4.

Vanderbilt

Sources:

In their first Legion Field game of the 1958 season, the Crimson Tide played the Vanderbilt Commodores to a 0–0 tie in Birmingham. The tie brought Alabama's all-time record against Vanderbilt to 18–16–3.

Furman

Sources:

In their first Denny Stadium game of the 1958 season, the Crimson Tide notched the first victory of the Bryant era with this 29–6 win over the Furman Purple Hurricane in Tuscaloosa. The Crimson Tide took an early 20–0 lead after they scored three touchdowns in the final four minutes of the first quarter. Bobby Jackson scored first on a two-yard run, the second was scored on a 16-yard Jackson pass to Laurien Stapp and the third on a 56-yard Gary O'Steen punt return. A 24-yard Pete Reaves field goal in the second quarter extended the Alabama lead to 23–0 at halftime. In the third quarter, Furman scored their only points of the game on a nine-yard Roy Nickles touchdown run. The Crimson Tide responded with a 61-yard Bobby Smith touchdown pass to O'Steen that made the final score 29–6. The victory improved Alabama's all-time record against Furman to 4–0.

Tennessee

Sources:

In their annual rivalry game against Tennessee, a pair of Billy Majors touchdowns for the Volunteers provided for the final margin in their 14–7 victory in Knoxville. After a scoreless first quarter, the Vols took a 7–0 halftime lead when Majors scored on a one-yard run on the first play of the second quarter. He then extended the Tennessee lead to 14–0 in the third on a seven-yard run, before Alabama made the final score 14–7 on a one-yard Bobby Jackson touchdown run. In the game, Alabama fumbled the ball five times and Tennessee recovered three of them. The loss brought Alabama's all-time record against Tennessee to 18–18–5.

Mississippi State

Sources:

On what was homecoming in Starkville, the Crimson Tide upset the Mississippi State Maroons 9–7 and secured Bryant's first SEC victory. Alabama took a 3–0 first quarter lead after Fred Sington, Jr. connected on a 22-yard field goal. Still up by three in the third quarter, the Crimson Tide scored their only touchdown of the game on a 21-yard Bobby Jackson pass to Norbie Ronsonet and extended their lead to 9–0. The Maroons managed their only points late in the fourth on a six-yard Billy Stacy touchdown run that made the final score 9–7. The victory was Alabama's first over a ranked opponent since their win over Auburn in 1953 and improved Alabama's all-time record against Mississippi State to 30–10–3.

Georgia

Sources:

On homecoming in Tuscaloosa, Alabama shutout the Georgia Bulldogs 12–0 for their second consecutive conference victory. The Crimson Tide took a 6–0 first quarter lead after Gary O'Steen scored on a 14-yard run and then made the final score 12–0 late in the fourth quarter on a short Bobby Jackson touchdown run. The victory gave Alabama their first two-game winning streak since the 1954 season and improved Alabama's all-time record against Georgia to 23–17–4.

Tulane

Sources:

On a Friday evening at New Orleans, the Crimson Tide were defeated 13–7 by the Tulane Green Wave after they turned the ball over on downs late in the fourth quarter. Richie Petitbon gave Tulane an early 6–0 lead with his two-yard touchdown run in the first quarter. Petitbon then extended the Green Wave lead to 13–0 late in the third on a one-yard run before Alabama scored their lone touchdown of the game. The only Crimson Tide points came on a one-yard Bobby Jackson touchdown run that capped a 73-yard drive in the fourth quarter. The loss brought Alabama's all-time record against Tulane to 17–10–2.

Georgia Tech

Sources: 

Behind a 17-point first quarter, the Crimson Tide upset the Georgia Tech Yellow Jackets 17–8 on homecoming at Grant Field. All 17 first quarter points were scored on drives that immediately followed a turnover. Bobby Jackson first scored on a one-yard touchdown run to cap a drive that started after a fumble was recovered by Baxter Booth. Duff Morrison's interception then set up the next Alabama scoring drive that ended when Pete Reaves connected on a 19-yard field goal for a 10–0 lead. The lead was then extended to 17–0 on a five-yard Jackson run that completed a drive started at the Tech 20-yard line when Milton Frank recovered a fumble. The only Yellow Jacket points came in the third quarter when a Calvin James fumble was recovered by Billy Shaw for a touchdown that made the final score 17–8 after a successful two-point conversion. The victory improved Alabama's all-time record against Georgia Tech to 19–18–3.

Memphis State

Sources: 

In what was the first all-time meeting against Memphis State, the Crimson Tide shutout the Tigers 14–0 in the final Denny Stadium game of the season. Alabama took a 6–0 first quarter lead after Bobby Jackson threw a 62-yard touchdown pass to Marlin Dyess on the first offensive play of the game. Jackson then scored what proved to be the final points of the game with his 18-yard touchdown run in the second quarter. He then successfully converted the two-point conversion that made the final score 14–0.

Auburn

Sources:

Against rival Auburn, the Crimson Tide nearly upset the No. 2 ranked Tigers but lost 14–8 at Legion Field in what was the closest game between the schools since the 1953 season. The Tigers' took an early 7–0 lead after Dick Wood threw a three-yard touchdown pass to Jim Pettus in the first quarter. Neither team would score again until late in the fourth quarter when Auburn went up 14–0 on a one-yard Jim Reynolds touchdown run. Alabama responded with a nine-yard Marlin Dyess touchdown run that cut the Tigers' lead to 14–8 after they converted a two-point conversion. The loss brought Alabama's all-time record against Auburn to 9–13–1.

Bluegrass Bowl
After their victory over Memphis State, Alabama players voted to accept any potential bowl bid if one was extended to the team. As they entered their final game of the season against Auburn, officials from the Bluegrass Bowl announced that the Crimson Tide was their top choice to participate in the inaugural event regardless of the outcome against the Tigers. Although the Crimson Tide were their top choice, on December 1, bowl officials announced that Florida State and Oklahoma State would participate in the game.

It was reported that prior to the announcement, the game was to have seen a rematch of Alabama against Vanderbilt, but that no deal was reached. After the Crimson Tide declined the invitation, Florida State accepted it. Years later, Bryant stated he regretted he did not accept the bid as it would have allowed for additional practice time at the conclusion of the season. The 1958 season also marked the only one where a Bryant-led team at Alabama failed to participate in a bowl game.

Freshmen squad
Prior to the 1972 NCAA University Division football season, NCAA rules prohibited freshmen from participating on the varsity team, and as such many schools fielded freshmen teams. For the 1958 season, the Alabama freshmen squad was coached by Sam Bailey and finished their season with a record of two wins, zero losses and one tie (2–0–1). In their first game against the Mississippi State Baby Maroons, a 27-yard Jimmy Spencer field goal fell short with under a minute left, and the game ended in a scoreless tie at Starkville. In their second game, the Crimson Tide defeated Tulane 25–6 before 3,000 fans at Denny Stadium. After the game was tied 6–6 at halftime, Alabama scored 19 unanswered points in the second half to win. Touchdowns were scored by Mal Moore on a one-yard run, a 37-yard Moore pass to Tommy Brooker and on a 22-yard Ronnie Davis pass to Steve Anderson. The Baby Tide then closed the season with a 14–6 win over Auburn in a game that saw touchdowns scored of runs of 10-yards by Jerry Rich and one-yard by Pat Trammell.

Personnel

Varsity letter winners

Coaching staff

NFL Draft

At the conclusion of the season several members of the 1958 squad were drafted into the National Football League. These players included: Bobby Jackson in the seventh round to the Green Bay Packers, Ernie Moore in the 29th round to the Los Angeles Rams and Dave Sington in the 30th round to the New York Giants.

References
General

 

Specific

Alabama
Alabama Crimson Tide football seasons
Alabama Crimson Tide football